Tanuja is a given name.

People with the name 

 Ashani Tanuja Weeraratna, American-South African cancer researcher
 Tanuja (born 1943), Indian film actress
 Tanuja Chandra, Indian film director and writer
 Tanuja Desai Hidier, American writer